In telecommunication, the term facsimile converter has the following meanings: 

1.  In a facsimile receiver, a device that changes the signal modulation from frequency-shift keying (FSK) to amplitude modulation (AM).  

2.  In a facsimile transmitter, a device that changes the signal modulation from amplitude modulation (AM) to frequency-shift keying (FSK).

References

Communication circuits
Computing terminology